Sphenomorphus maculicollus is a species of skink. It is found in Malaysia.

References

maculicollus
Reptiles of Malaysia
Reptiles described in 1967
Taxa named by James Patterson Bacon
Reptiles of Borneo